Jamdani is a fine muslin textile (figured with different patterns) produced for centuries in South Rupshi of Narayanganj district on the bank of Shitalakhwa river in what was Bengal and eventually became Bangladesh - see Partition of India. 

The historic production of jamdani was patronized by imperial warrants of the Mughal emperors. Under British colonialism, the Bengali jamdani and muslin industries rapidly declined due to colonial import policies favoring industrially manufactured textiles. In more recent years, the production of jamdani has witnessed a revival in Bangladesh. Jamdani is typically woven using a mixture of cotton and gold thread.

In 2013, the traditional art of weaving jamdani was declared a UNESCO Intangible Cultural Heritage of Humanity.

In 2016, Bangladesh received geographical indication (GI) status for Jamdani Sari.

Etymology
Jamdani was originally known as Dhakai (Daccai) named after the city of Dhaka (Dacca), one of many ancient textile weaving centers in Bengal region. Under the Mughal Empire the Persian term Jamdani came to be in popular use, since it was the court language of the Mughals. Jamdanis are popularly known as Dhakai Jamdani or simply Dhakai. The earliest mention of jamdani and its development as an industry is found into Dhaka, Bangladesh.

Origin
An early reference to Indian origins of muslin is found in the book of Periplus of the Erythraean Sea and in the accounts of Arab, Chinese and Italian travelers and traders.

Jamdani is a hand loom woven fabric made of cotton, which was historically referred to as muslin. The Jamdani weaving tradition is of Bengali origin. It is one of the most time and labor-intensive forms of hand loom weaving, and is considered one of the finest varieties of muslin, and the most artistic textile of Bangladeshi weavers. Traditionally woven around Dhaka and created on the loom brocade, jamdani is rich in motifs. In the late 19th
century, T. N. Mukharji referred to this fabric as jamdani muslin.

Weave

Whether figured or flowered, jamdani is a woven fabric in cotton. This is a supplementary weft technique of weaving, where the artistic motifs are produced by a non-structural weft, in addition to the standard weft that holds the warp threads together. The standard weft creates a fine, sheer fabric while the supplementary weft with thicker threads adds the intricate patterns to it. Each supplementary weft motif is added separately by hand by interlacing the weft threads into the warp with fine bamboo sticks using individual spools of thread. The result is a complex mix of different patterns that appear to float on a shimmering surface. The pattern is not sketched or outlined on the fabric, but is drawn on a graph paper and placed underneath the warp. Jamdani is a fine muslin cloth on which decorative motifs are woven on the loom, typically in grey and white. Often a mixture of cotton and gold thread was used.

Varieties of jamdani work
Though mostly used for saris, Jamdani is also used for scarves and handkerchiefs. Jamdani is believed to be a fusion of the ancient cloth-making techniques of Bengal (possibly 2,000 years old) with the muslins produced by Bengali Muslims since the 14th century. Jamdani is the most expensive product of Dhaka looms since it requires the most lengthy and dedicated work.

Jamdani patterns are mostly of geometric, plant, and floral designs and are said to have originated thousands of years ago. Due to the exquisite painstaking methodology required, only aristocrats and royal families were able to afford such luxuries.

Changes with time
We do not know exactly when jamdani came to be adorned with floral patterns of the loom. It is, however, certain that in the Mughal period, most likely during the reign of either Emperor Akbar (1556–1605) or Emperor Jahangir (1605–1627), the figured or flowered muslin came to be known as the jamdani. John Forbes Watson in his work titled Textile Manufactures and Costumes of the people of India holds that the figured muslins, because of their complicated designs, were always considered the most expensive productions of the Dhaka looms.
The price for a piece was recorded as 56 Livre in 1776.

Decline and fall
From the middle of the 19th century, there was a gradual decline in the jamdani industry. A number of factors contributed to this decline. The subsequent import of lower quality, but cheaper yarn from Europe, started the decline. Most importantly, the decline of Mughal power in India, deprived the producers of jamdani of their most influential patrons. Villages like Madhurapur and Jangalbari, (both in the Kishoreganj district), once famous for the jamdani industry went into gradual oblivion.

Current problems

According to a national daily, a senior taanti or "ostad" earns about Tk 2,500 to Tk 3,000 per month. Junior weavers get much less, around Tk 1,600. As a result, many weavers do not want their children to come to the profession, preferring the more lucrative garments industry.

The government and other organizations are trying to revive the old glory of Dhakai Jamdani. In a bid to avoid the middlemen, they are trying to establish direct contact with the weavers. A Jamdani Palli has been established near Dhaka. Jamdani, one of the oldest forms of cottage industry in Bangladesh, was once a dying trade. Organizations like Radiant Institute of Design, Shanto Mariam University of creative technology, National Institute of Design, and others are helping designers create new Jamdani designs.

Jamdani is a symbol of aristocracy. The demand for quality Jamdani Sarees has increased greatly over the years.

Geographical indication 
In 2016, Bangladesh received geographical indication (GI) status for Jamdani Sari. It was the first GI status given to any Bangladeshi product.

Images

References

External links
Jamdani's Struggle to Survive
Jamdani on Banglapedia
Bangladesh Handloom Board Official Website

Bangladeshi clothing
Woven fabrics
Saris
Bangladeshi handicrafts
Masterpieces of the Oral and Intangible Heritage of Humanity
Textile arts of Bangladesh